The 2011–12 FA Women's Cup is the 41st season of the association football knockout competition. 276 clubs competed for the years trophy. The winners will not qualify for the UEFA Women's Champions League. The current holders are now Birmingham City LFC. They beat Chelsea 3–2 in a penalty shootout after a 2–2 draw in the final at Ashton Gate.

Teams

Calendar

First Round Proper results 
Sheffield United Community LFC
0 – 1
Middlesbrough LFC
8 January 2012 at Thornaby FC  
 
California Ladies
0 – 8
Durham Wildcats LFC
8 January 2012 at Spennymoor Town FC
 
Blackpool Wren Rovers LFC
3 – 2
Mossley Hill LFC
8 January 2012 at Mossley Hill Athletics Club, Liverpool
  
Liverpool Feds LFC
1 – 3
Sheffield Wednesday LFC
18 December 2011 at Herron Eccles Playing Field, Liverpool  
 
Stockport County LFC
2 – 3
South Durham & Cestria LFC
11 December 2011 at Woodley Sports FC  
 
Bradford City LFC
3 – 2
Newcastle United LFC
11 December 2011 at Thackley FC
   
Crusaders LFC
0 – 3
Coventry Sphinx LFC
11 December 2011 at Cadbury Athletic FC 
 
Loughborough Foxes LFC
3 – 0
Radcliffe Olympic LFC
11 December 2011 at Loughborough Dynamo FC  
 
AFC Trinity LFC
2 – 5
Leicester City LFC
11 December 2011 at Nether Heyford Playing Fields  
 
Loughborough Students LFC
5 – 3
Wolverhampton Wanderers LFC
11 December 2011 at Loughborough University, Holywell 5
  
Copsewood LFC
3 – 6
Stoke City LFC
11 December 2011 at Coventry Copsewood FC  
 
MSA LFC
2 – 1
Westfield LFC
11 December 2011 at Douglas Eyre Sports Ground, Walthamstow  
 
Norwich City LFC
0 – 3
Denham United LFC
11 December 2011 at Norwich United FC 
 
C&K Basildon LFC
0 – 3
Lewes LFC
11 December 2011 at Selex Sports & Leisure Club, Basildon  
 
Ebbsfleet United LFC
1 – 5
Havant & Waterlooville LFC
11 December 2011 at Ebbsfleet United FC  
 
Crawley Wasps LFC
W – W
Ipswich Town LFC
11 December 2011 walkover for Crawley Wasps  
 
Cambridge Women's
2 – 5
Oxford United LFC
11 December 2011 at The Cambridge Football Stadium  
 
Bracknell Town LFC
0 – 5
Enfield Town LFC
11 December 2011 at Bracknell Town FC
   
Chichester City LFC
5 – 2
Peterborough Sports LFC
11 December 2011 at Chichester City FC  
 
Billericay Town LFC
3 – 6
Peterborough Northern Star LFC
11 December 2011 at Billericay Town FC  
 
Shanklin LFC
3 – 1
Boscombe Albion LFC
11 December 2011 at County Ground, Shanklin  
 
Newquay LFC
2 – 2
Larkhall Athletic LFC
11 December 2011 Larkhall Athletic won 7–6 on PKs – at Newquay FC 
 
Forest Green Rovers LFC
5 – 1
Weymouth LFC_
11 December 2011 at Slimbridge FC  
 
Swindon Town LFC
2 – 1
Exeter City LFC
11 December 2011 at Weirfield, Devizes Road, Swindon

Second Round Proper results 
Lowest team remaining at start of round – Durham Wildcats LFC (3rd place Durham WFL level 7 of pyramid)

South Durham & Cestria LFC
0 – 3
Bradford City LFC
8 January 2012
at Darlington Railway Athletic FC
   
Larkhall Athletic LFC
2 – 1
Shanklin LFC
8 January 2012
at Larkhall Athletic FC
   
Preston North End LFC
7 – 3
Stoke City LFC
8 January 2012
at Bamber Bridge FC
  
Rochdale LFC
1 – 2
Blackburn Rovers LFC
8 January 2012
at Chadderton FC
   
Leicester City LFC
2 – 1
Loughborough Students LFC
8 January 2012
at Aylestone Park FC
   
Derby County LFC
3 – 1
Loughborough Foxes LFC
8 January 2012
at Borrowash Victoria FC
   
Leicester City WFC
0 – 1
Sporting Club Albion LFC
8 January 2012
at Leicestershire & Rutland County FA, Holmes Park
   
Coventry Sphinx LFC
0 – 1
Peterborough Northern Star LFC
8 January 2012
at Coventry Sphinx FC
   
Crawley Wasps LFC
0 – 0
MSA LFC
8 January 2012
MSA won 3–0 on PKs – at The Sports Ground, Bolney Road, Horsham
   
Oxford United LFC
2 – 0
Lewes LFC
8 January 2012
at Oxford United Academy, Roman Way, Oxford
   
Enfield Town LFC
1 – 1
Queens Park Rangers LFC
8 January 2012
Enfield Town won 4–3 on PKs – at Enfield Town FC
   
Gillingham LFC
3 – 0
Colchester United LFC
8 January 2012
at Chatham Town FC
   
Brighton & Hove Albion LFC
2 – 1
Millwall Lionesses LFC
8 January 2012
at Withdean Stadium
   
Tottenham Hotspur LFC
7 – 0
Denham United LFC
8 January 2012
at Harlow Town FC
   
Chichester City LFC
0 – 3
West Ham United LFC
8 January 2012
at Chichester City FC
   
Havant & Waterlooville LFC
3 – 2
Plymouth Argyle LFC
8 January 2012
at Havant & Waterlooville FC
   
Keynsham Town LFC
7 – 1
Swindon Town LFC
8 January 2012
at Keynsham Town FC 
 
Portsmouth LFC
4 – 1
Forest Green Rovers LFC
8 January 2012
at Moneyfields FC  
 
Manchester City LFC
9 – 1
Leeds City Vixens LFC
8 January 2012
at The Regional Athletics Arena, Rowsley Street, Manchester

Blackpool Wren Rovers 3 – 4 Rotherham United 15 January 2012 at Blackpool Rovers FC

Sheffield FC Ladies 10 – 0 Middlesbrough at Sheffield FC 22 January 2012

Sheffield Wednesday LFC 1 – 3 Durham Wildcats at Retford United FC 22 January 2012

Third Round Proper Draw 
The lowest team remaining in the competition at the start of the round are: Durham Wildcats LFC 

All matches scheduled for Sunday, 5 February 2012 at 2pm.  After a complete postponement due to snow on the 5th 12 of the 16 fixtures were again postponed due to snow on the 12th.  The remaining fixtures are rescheduled for 19 February.

Third Round Proper results 

Keynsham Town LFC 4 – 1 Gillingham LFC at Keynsham Town FC 12 February 2012

Leicester City LFC 1 – 2 Cardiff City LFC at Alystone Park FC 12 February 2012

Manchester City LFC 4 – 1 Oxford United at The Regional Athletics Arena, Rowsley Street 12 February 2012

Durham Wildcats LFC 0 – 2 Preston North End LFC at Spennymoor Town FC 12 February 2012

Portsmouth LFC 1 – 3 Sheffield FC Ladies at Portsmouth FC 19 February 2012

Brighton & Hove Albion LFC 4 – 2 Haven't & Waterloo LFC at Brighton & Hove Albion FC 19 February 2012

Charlton Athletic LFC 3 – 1 Bradford City LFC at Charlton Athletic FC 19 February 2012

Enfield Town LFC 2 – 0 MSA LFC at Enfield Town FC 19 February 2012

Larkhall Athletic LFC 1 – 1 Tottenham Hotspur LFC at Larkhall Athletic FC 19 February 2012 Larkhall wins 4–2 on PKs

Watford LFC 1 – 6 Leeds United LFC at Watford FC 19 February 2012

Aston Villa LFC 0 – 2 Coventry City LFC at Aston Villa FC 19 February 2012

Derby County LFC 4 – 2 West Ham United LFC at Derby County FC 19 February 2012

Sunderland WFC 8 – 0 Rotherdam United LFC at Sunderland FC 19 February 2012

Barnet FC Ladies 8 – 0 Peterborough Northern Star LFC at Barnet FC 19 February 2012

Nottingham Forest LFC 0 – 3 Blackburn Rovers LFC at Nottingham Forest FC 19 February 2012

Sporting Club Albion LFC 3 – 0 Reading FC Women at Albion FC 19 February 2012

Fourth Round Proper Draw 
The lowest team remaining in the competition is: Larkhall Athletic LFC 2nd Place South West Premier Division (Level 5 of pyramid)

All matches scheduled for Sunday, 26 February 2012 at 2pm GST.

Fourth Round Proper results 

Cardiff City LFC 0 – 7 Sunderland WFC at Cardiff International Sports Stadium 26 February 2012

Barnet FC Ladies 3–0 Sporting Club Albion LFC at Barnet FC 26 February 2012

Brighton & Hove Albion LFC 3–0 Larkhall Athletic LFC at Withdean Stadium 26 February 2012

Enfield Town LFC 0–2 Manchester City LFC at Enfield Town FC 26 February 2012

Charlton Athletic LFC 2–0 Derby County LFC at Thamesmead Town FC 26 February 2012

Coventry City LFC 1–2 Leeds United LFC  at Bedworth United FC 26 February 2012

Keynsham Town LFC  5–2 Sheffield FC Ladies at Keynsham Town FC 26 February 2012

Preston North End LFC 0–2 Blackburn Rovers LFC at Bamber Bridge FC 26 February 2012

Fifth Round Proper Draw 
The lowest teams remaining in the competition are: Keynsham Town LFC 7th Place FA Women's Southern Division 
and Blackburn Rovers LFC 7th Place FA Women's Northern Division (Level 3 of pyramid)

All matches scheduled for Sunday, 11 March 2012 at 2pm GST.

Fifth Round Proper results 

Keynsham Town LFC 1 – 5 Sunderland WFC at Keynsham Town FC 11 March 2012

Bristol Academy WFC 3 – 0 Leeds United LFC at Bristol Academy WFC 11 March 2012

Barnet FC Ladies FC 1 – 2 (AET) Doncaster Rovers Belles LFC at Barnet FC 11 March 2012

Charlton Athletic LFC 1–5 Blackburn Rovers LFC at Thamesmead Town FC 11 March 2012

Lincoln Ladies FC 0–1 Arsenal LFC at Lincoln United FC 11 March 2012

Birmingham City LFC 3–0 Liverpool LFC at Stratford Town FC 11 March 2012

Manchester City LFC 1–5 Everton LFC at Cheadle Town FC 11 March 2012

Chelsea LFC 3–0 Brighton & Hove Albion LFC at Staines Town FC 11 March 2012

Sixth Round Proper 
The lowest team remaining in the competition is: Blackburn Rovers LFC 7th Place FA Women's Northern Division (Level 3 of pyramid)

Semi-finals

Final Matchup

References

External links 
 http://www.thefa.com/Competitions/FACompetitions/TheFAWomensCup
 https://web.archive.org/web/20120605033304/http://www.shekicks.net/fixtures-and-results/category/1

Women's FA Cup seasons
Cup